"I Like It" is a song by English electronic music duo Narcotic Thrust featuring British singer Yvonne John Lewis on vocals. Written by Andy Morris, Stuart Crichton, and Robert de Fresnes and produced by the former two, the song was released as a standalone single on 5 April 2004. Andrew Levy from acid jazz group the Brand New Heavies plays bass guitar on the song while ex-member Jan Kincaid handles the percussion.

Upon its release, "I Like It" debuted and peaked at number nine on the UK Singles Chart in April 2004, becoming the duo's sole top-10 hit in the UK. The single also reached the top 20 in Flanders, Greece, the Netherlands, and Romania, as well as on three US Billboard dance charts. A music video was made for the song, featuring several female cheerleaders with red pom-poms dancing in a bright grey room filled with confetti.

Composition
Composed in the key of F-sharp minor, "I Like It" has a tempo of 130 beats per minute. The original mix is seven minutes and twenty-five seconds long while the version released to radio is three minutes and six seconds in length.

Track listings

UK CD1
 "I Like It" (radio edit) – 3:06
 "I Like It" (M Black remix) – 7:18
 "I Like It" (Tom Mangan remix) – 8:03
 "I Like It" (original mix) – 7:24
 "I Like It" (Sinewave Surfers 2am mix) – 5:33
 "I Like It" (video, photo gallery, lyrics and screensaver)

UK CD2
 "I Like It" (radio edit) – 3:06
 "I Like It" (original CD mix) – 4:52

UK 12-inch single
A1. "I Like It" (original mix) – 7:24
A2. "I Like It" (Sinewave Surfers 2am mix) – 5:33
B1. "I Like It" (M Black remix) – 7:18
B2. "I Like It" (Tom Mangan Remix) – 5:42

Australian CD single
 "I Like It" (radio edit) – 3:06
 "I Like It" (Sinewave Surfers Mix) – 5:34
 "I Like It" (Tom Mangan Remix) – 8:02
 "I Like It" (original mix) – 7:25

Credits and personnel
Credits are adapted from the UK CD1 liner notes.

Studios
 Recorded at SCS Studios (Fulham, London, England)
 Mixed at Sahara Studios (Fulham, London, England)
 Mastered at 360 Mastering (Hastings, East Sussex, England)

Personnel
 Andy Morris – writing, production
 Stuart Crichton – writing, production, mixing
 Robert de Fresnes – writing
 Yvonne John Lewis – vocals
 Andrew Levy – bass
 Jan Kincaid – percussion
 Pete Craigie – mixing
 Richard Beetham – mastering

Charts

Weekly charts

Year-end charts

Release history

References

2004 singles
Songs written by Andy Morris (musician)
Songs written by Stuart Crichton
UK Independent Singles Chart number-one singles